The 1964 Arizona State Sun Devils baseball team represented Arizona State University in the 1964 NCAA University Division baseball season. The Sun Devils played their home games at Phoenix Municipal Stadium, and played as part of the Western Athletic Conference. The team was coached by Bobby Winkles in his fifth season as head coach at Arizona State.

Personnel

Roster

Coaches

Schedule and results

References

Arizona State Sun Devils baseball seasons
Arizona State Sun Devils
College World Series seasons
Arizona State Sun Devils baseball